Gibbonsville is an unincorporated community in Lemhi County, Idaho, United States. Gibbonsville has a post office with ZIP code 83463.

History
Gibbonsville is named for John Gibbon.

Gibbonsville's population was 735 in 1909, and was 125 in 1960.

Climate

Gibbonsville, nestled in the Bitterroot Mountains, has a climate rather typical of its region, although it is warmer than stations located at higher elevations. The climate is of the Warm Summer Humid Continental type (Köppen Dfb), but is quite different than most climates with this classification, owing to characteristics shared with its climatic brethren in the Bitterroot range, as well as parts of Wyoming and Montana (foremost among them being West Yellowstone, Montana), such as the high daily ranges of temperature throughout the year, being 18.6 degrees Fahrenheit (10.3 °C) in December, rising to nearly 40 degrees Fahrenheit (22.2 °C) in July. Although Gibbonsville does not have true wet and dry seasons, there is significantly more precipitation in winter than summer. Snowfall averages around 80 inches per year, a hefty average compared with most of the U.S., but rather typical for its region. The average of 80 inches usually falls between November and April, with January being the snowiest month.

References

Unincorporated communities in Lemhi County, Idaho
Unincorporated communities in Idaho